Carlos Leonel Trucco Medina (born 11 August 1957) is a former football goalkeeper who played 51 games for the Bolivia national team between 1989 and 1997.

Despite being born in Argentina, Trucco was the starting goalkeeper of Bolivia national football team during 1994 FIFA World Cup. He played all 3 group games and conceded 4 goals.

Trucco started his club career in Argentina where he played for Unión de Santa Fe, Vélez Sársfield and Estudiantes de Río Cuarto.

In 1985, he moved to Bolivia  where he played for Club Destroyers and Bolívar.

He also played for Deportivo Cali in Colombia and Pachuca in Mexico.

After he retired from playing, Trucco became a football coach. He has managed Veracruz and San Luis in Mexico and Wilstermann in Bolivia, and was appointed manager of the Bolivia national football team in 2001.

References

External links

1957 births
Living people
Footballers from Córdoba, Argentina
Association football goalkeepers
Bolivian footballers
Bolivian expatriate footballers
Bolivia international footballers
Argentine footballers
1995 Copa América players
1997 Copa América players
1994 FIFA World Cup players
Club Destroyers players
Oriente Petrolero players
Club Bolívar players
Unión de Santa Fe footballers
Club Atlético Vélez Sarsfield footballers
Deportivo Cali footballers
Cruz Azul footballers
C.F. Pachuca players
Bolivian Primera División players
Argentine Primera División players
Categoría Primera A players
Liga MX players
Expatriate footballers in Colombia
Expatriate footballers in Mexico
Bolivian expatriate sportspeople in Colombia
Bolivian expatriate sportspeople in Mexico
Argentine football managers
Bolivian football managers
Bolivia national football team managers
C.D. Veracruz managers
C.F. Pachuca managers
Argentine emigrants to Bolivia
Naturalized citizens of Bolivia
Estudiantes de Río Cuarto footballers
Bolivian expatriate football managers
Argentine expatriate football managers